"Toto" is a song by Albanian rapper Noizy featuring Austrian rapper RAF Camora. It was released as a single on 15 June 2019 by Warner Music Germany.

Background and composition 

"Toto" was written by Noizy and RAF Camora and composed by both rappers alongside Junior Bula Monga and Sany Kaou. It was produced by Junior à la prod and Sany San and mixed by Lex Barkey. It was made available for digital download and streaming on 15 June 2018 through Warner Germany.

Music video and promotion 

An accompanying music video for "Toto" was uploaded to the official YouTube channel of Noizy on 15 June 2018. In March 2019, Noizy was invited as special guest to perform the single live during a concert of RAF Camora and German rapper Bonez MC at the Lanxess Arena in Cologne, Germany.

Personnel 

Credits adapted from Tidal.

Rigels Rajkucomposing, songwriting, vocals
Raphael Raguccicomposing, songwriting, vocals
Junior à la prodproducing
Sany Sanproducing
Junior Bula Mongacomposing
Sany Kaoucomposing
Lex Barkeymixing

Track listing 

Digital download
"Toto"3:25

Charts

Certifications

Release history

References 

  
2018 singles
2018 songs
Albanian-language songs
German-language Albanian songs
German-language songs
Noizy songs
Warner Music Group singles